The following radio stations broadcast on AM frequency 1197 kHz:

China 
 CNR The Voice of China in Quanzhou

Taiwan 
 CNR The Voice of China in Kinmen

References

Lists of radio stations by frequency